Eureiandra is a genus of plant in the family Cucurbitaceae.

References

 
Cucurbitaceae genera
Taxonomy articles created by Polbot
Taxa named by Joseph Dalton Hooker